The 15th Arizona State Legislature, consisting of the Arizona State Senate and the Arizona House of Representatives, was constituted in Phoenix from January 1, 1941, to December 31, 1942, during the first of  Sidney Preston Osborn's four consecutive terms as Governor of Arizona. The number of senators and house representatives remained constant at 19 and 52, respectively. The Democrats controlled one hundred percent of both the senate and house seats.

Sessions
The Legislature met for the regular session at the State Capitol in Phoenix on January 13, 1941; and adjourned on March 17. There was a special session which was held from April 6–25, 1942.

State Senate

Members

The asterisk (*) denotes members of the previous Legislature who continued in office as members of this Legislature.

House of Representatives

Members
The asterisk (*) denotes members of the previous Legislature who continued in office as members of this Legislature. The size of the House remained constant at 52 members.

References

Arizona legislative sessions
1941 in Arizona
1942 in Arizona
1941 U.S. legislative sessions
1942 U.S. legislative sessions